Crises refers to the plural of crisis.

Crises may also refer to:

Acronym
 CRISES, French research Centre

Music
 Crises (album) by Mike Oldfield 1983
 Crises Tour 1983, tour by Mike Oldfield
 Crises, album by R. Stevie Moore 1983
"Les Crises de l'Ame" by Jeanne Mas

See also 
 Chryses, cfr: Greek mythology, people of the Trojan War, and characters in the Iliad (Trojan priest and father of Chryseis)
 Chryses (disambiguation), is a name of several figures in Greek mythology